The Rural Municipality of Oakview is a rural municipality (RM) in the Canadian province of Manitoba, incorporated on January 1, 2015 as a result of the amalgamation of the rural municipalities of Blanshard, Saskatchewan, and the Town of Rapid City. It was formed as a requirement of The Municipal Amalgamations Act, which required that municipalities with a population less than 1,000 amalgamate with one or more neighbouring municipalities by 2015. The Government of Manitoba initiated these amalgamations in order for municipalities to meet the 1997 minimum population requirement of 1,000 to incorporate a municipality.

Demographics 

References 

2015 establishments in Manitoba
Manitoba municipal amalgamations, 2015
Populated places established in 2015
Rural municipalities in Manitoba